Bitbucket is a Git-based source code repository hosting service owned by Atlassian.  Bitbucket offers both commercial plans and free accounts with an unlimited number of private repositories.

Services

Bitbucket Cloud 
Bitbucket Cloud (previously known as Bitbucket) is written in Python using the Django web framework.

Bitbucket is mostly used for code and code review. Bitbucket supports the following features:
 Pull requests with code review and comments
 Bitbucket Pipelines, a continuous delivery service
 Two-step verification and required two-step verification
 IP whitelisting
 Merge Checks
 Code search (Alpha)
 Git Large File Storage (LFS)
 Documentation, including automatically rendered README files in a variety of Markdown-like file formats
 Issue tracking
 Wikis
 Static sites hosted on Bitbucket Cloud: Static websites have the bitbucket.io domain in their URL
 Add-ons and integrations
 REST APIs to build third-party applications which can use any development language
 Snippets that allow developers to share code segments or files
 Smart Mirroring

Bitbucket Server

Bitbucket Server (formerly known as Stash) is a combination Git server and web interface product written in Java and built with Apache Maven. It allows users to do basic Git operations (such as reviewing or merging code, similar to GitHub) while controlling read and write access to the code. It also provides integration with other Atlassian tools.

Bitbucket Server is a commercial software product that can be licensed for running on-premises. Atlassian provides Bitbucket Server for free to open source projects meeting certain criteria, and to organizations that are non-profit, non-government, non-academic, non-commercial, non-political, and secular. For academic and commercial customers, the full source code is available under a developer source license.

History 
Bitbucket was previously an independent startup company, founded by Jesper Nøhr in 2008. On 29 September 2010, Bitbucket was acquired by Atlassian. In September 2015, Atlassian renamed their Stash product to Bitbucket Server. In July 2016, Bitbucket added support for Git Large File Storage (LFS).
In March 2020, Bitbucket Server controversially dropped support for viewing three way diffs and in July 2020, Bitbucket Cloud removed support for its original repository format Mercurial.

See also
 Atlassian
 Comparison of source code hosting facilities
 Distributed version control
 Git (software)
 GitHub
 Gitea
 GitLab
 Revision control

References

External links
 
 Atlassian

Project hosting websites
Project management software
Computing websites
Version control
Atlassian products
Open-source software hosting facilities
2010 mergers and acquisitions